Escuelas Deportivas de Láncara was a futsal club based in A Pobra de San Xiao, belonging to Láncara municipality, Galicia, but that played his matches in Lugo.

The club was founded in 1995 and played its home games in Pazo Provincial with capacity of 6,000 seats.

The club was sponsored by Barcel Euro from 2004–05 until 2005–06.

History
The club was founded in 1995. His greatest achievement was playing in División de Honor in the seasons 2004–05 and 2005–06. In 2006, the club had accumulated many debts of previous seasons. At beginning of 2006–07 season, the club sold its seat to Cometal Celta de Vigo.

Season to season

2 seasons in División de Honor
2 seasons in División de Plata
4 season in 1ª Nacional A
2 season in 1ª Nacional B

References

Externan link
Former Official Website
History

Futsal clubs in Galicia (Spain)
Futsal clubs established in 1995
Sports clubs disestablished in 2006
1995 establishments in Spain
2006 disestablishments in Spain